Familiar Stranger is the sixth studio album by American country music artist Mark Wills. Originally recorded for Equity Music Group, it was released on November 4, 2008 by Tenacity Records. While signed to Equity, Wills released three singles: "Hank", "Take It All Out on Me" and "Days of Thunder", all of which reached the lower regions of the Billboard country charts. ("Hank" was never included on an album.) After "Days of Thunder", Wills exited the label. He then signed to Tenacity, who released "The Things We Forget" as its third single, then released the album itself in late 2008. "Entertaining Angels" was then issued as the fourth single in early 2009.  The fifth single, "Crazy White Boy," was released in late 2009. The latter three failed to enter the country charts.

Track listing
"Days of Thunder" (Brett James, Aimee Mayo) - 3:06
"The Things We Forget" (Connie Harrington, Wendell Mobley) - 3:33
"Entertaining Angels" (Keith Brown, Willie Mack, Steve Mandile) - 3:56
"Closer" (Bart Allmand, Jeffrey Steele) - 3:38
"Panama City" (Mayo, Rivers Rutherford, Troy Verges) - 3:33
"Take It All Out on Me" (Jim Collins, Mobley) - 3:26
"Rednecks Anonymous" (Ashley Gorley, Bryant Simpson) - 3:12
"The Likes of You" (Don Rollins, John Scott Sherrill, D. Vincent Williams) - 3:07
"Crazy White Boy" (Blair Daly, James) - 3:59
"What Are You Doing" (Bart Butler, Billie Decker, Mack) - 3:46
"Her Kiss" (Butler, Decker, Mack) - 3:51
"All the Crap I Do" (John Bettis, James) - 3:56

Personnel
Tim Akers- keyboards, piano
Larry Beaird- acoustic guitar
Mike Brignardello- bass guitar
Bob Britt- electric guitar
Dan Dugmore- pedal steel guitar
Kenny Greenberg- electric guitar
Tommy Harden- drums
Brett James- background vocals
Troy Lancaster- electric guitar
Chris McHugh- drums
Russ Pahl- pedal steel guitar
Mike Rojas- keyboards, piano
Gary Smith- Hammond B-3 organ, piano
Ilya Toshinsky- acoustic guitar, mandolin
Mark Wills- lead vocals
Jonathan Yudkin- fiddle, mandolin

References

External links
[ Familiar Stranger] at Allmusic

2008 albums
Mark Wills albums
Albums produced by Brett James